The Military ranks of the Socialist Republic of Romania are the military insignia used by the Army of the Socialist Republic of Romania. The ranks replaced the Military ranks of the Kingdom of Romania in 1947, following the proclamation of the Republic. The ranks were replaced by the Romanian Armed Forces ranks and insignia, following the Romanian Revolution. Since Romania was a member of the Warsaw Pact, it shared a rank structure to the Soviet Union. However, after the Warsaw Pact invasion of Czechoslovakia, Romania gradually moved towards the pre-war ranks.

Commissioned officer ranks
The rank insignia of commissioned officers.

Other ranks
The rank insignia of non-commissioned officers and enlisted personnel.

Notes

References

External links